The  (EB, lit. "Erfurt railway") is a railway company and public transit system serving the city of Erfurt, the capital of Thuringia, Germany.  is a wholly owned subsidiary of the Erfurt city council, and Süd-Thüringen-Bahn, operating between Erfurt and Meiningen, is a subsidiary of the former. Services are operated by Regio-Shuttle RS1 and Bombardier Itino trains.

History 
Even during the period of East Germany, the company remained independent, because it was organised as a municipal institution. After the reunification of Germany, the town tried to secure the railway service and founded on 1 May 1990 a GmbH, the Erfurter Industriebahn (EIB), with all capital shares held by Erfurt. On 20 September 1995 the company became the first municipal enterprise in East Germany to be recognized as a "" (public non-federal railway). As the transport of goods alone seemed to have no future perspective, the company tried to enter regional passenger transport in Thuringia, a privilege that was granted on 10  April 1997. On 15 September that year, a contract was signed by the state of Thuringia and the EIB. The new focus was reflected in a new name, "Erfurter Bahn", on 3 March 2007. Erfurter Bahn is a subsidiary of the Erfurt city council. The trains used for passenger transport are Regio-Shuttle RS1 and Bombardier Itino.

The track  can thus be served, and the track  upon reopening.

 and  employed in 2014 around 440 people. The railway designed a special train celebrating  in 2015, the celebration of the first documentation of the city.

Lines 
Line 46 was opened on 14 December 2002. Known as the Bahnstrecke Plaue–Themar, it runs from Erfurt Hauptbahnhof via Ilmenau to the Rennsteig.

Lines 40 and 50 are called the Unterfranken Shuttle. Line 40 on the Schweinfurt–Meiningen railway, serves Schweinfurt and Meiningen, Line 50 on the Franconian Saale Valley Railway, serves Gemünden am Main, Bad Kissingen and Schweinfurt, ending not at the central station but continuing to Schweinfurt Stadt.

The trademark Elster Saale Bahn and the opening of these new lines in eastern Thuringia was announced at the centenary of the Erfurter Bahn.

Unterfranken Shuttle 

All trains do not end in Schweinfurt at the main train station, but continue in the direction of Bamberg to Schweinfurt Stadt, which is close to the city centre.

Elster Saale Bahn 

The brand name Elster Saale Bahn was announced on the 100th anniversary of the Erfurt Bahn and has been used for the East Thuringian diesel network routes ever since.

Pfefferminzbahn 

Im Berufsverkehr und im Wochenend-Nachtverkehr verkehren einzelne Züge zwischen Erfurt, Weimar und Apolda.

Ehemalige Linien 

 EB 1: Erfurt Hbf – Bad Langensalza – Mühlhausen – Leinefelde – Eichenberg (seit 24. Mai 1998) und weiter nach Kassel-Wilhelmshöhe (betrieben Mai 1999–Dezember 2013, ab Dezember 2006 reduziert)
 EB 2: Gotha – Bad Langensalza (betrieben Mai 2000–Dezember 2013)

When the timetable changed in December 2006, the Nordhessische Verkehrsverbund ordered a large part of the SPNV services of the EB in its area, so that the majority of the trains already turned in Eichenberg and only individual journeys were tied through to Kassel-Wilhelmshöhe. After massive passenger complaints and a significant decline in the number of passengers, EB has been running most of the trains between Eichenberg and Kassel-Wilhelmshöhe since April 1, 2007 on its own business basis, which according to its own statements was about 80 percent of the trains on this section until the timetable change in 2006 train kilometers travelled. A pair of trains that initially ran to Göttingen in the morning and also on their own business have also turned around in Kassel-Wilhelmshöhe since the timetable change in 2007. On December 15, 2013, operations on lines 1 and 2 were handed over to DB Regio.

The Erfurt - Ilmenau - Rennsteig line and the service station at Ilmenau station were handed over to the subsidiary Süd-Thüringen-Bahn in December 2017, which had previously operated them on behalf of the Erfurter Bahn.

References

Literature 
 Frehner Consulting GmbH (ed.):  (in German) 2007
 Burkhard Beyer:  In: . , ISSN 0458-1822, p. 18.

External links 
 

Railway companies of Germany
Rail transport in Germany
Companies based in Erfurt